Floyd Ernest Mishler (September 23, 1893 – July 19, 1973) was an American football coach and physical education advocate. He was the head football coach at McPherson College in McPherson, Kansas, serving for two seasons, from 1923 to 1924, and compiling a record of 9–7–2.  He later worked as a high school physical education instructor in California.

Head coaching record

References

1893 births
1973 deaths
McPherson Bulldogs football coaches